Epsilon Reticuli, Latinized from ε Reticuli, is a double star approximately 59 light-years away in the constellation of Reticulum. The primary component is an orange subgiant, while the secondary is a white dwarf. The two stars share a common motion through space and hence most likely form a binary star system. The brighter star should be easily visible without optical aid under dark skies in the southern hemisphere. In 2000, an extrasolar planet was confirmed to be orbiting the primary star in the system.

Star system 

The primary component, Epsilon Reticuli A, is a subgiant star with a stellar classification of K2IV, indicating that the fusing of hydrogen in its core is coming to an end and it is in the process of expanding to a red giant. With an estimated mass of about 1.5 times the solar mass, it was probably an F0 star while in the main sequence. It has a radius of 3.18 times the solar radius, a luminosity of 6.2 the solar luminosity and an effective temperature of 4,961 K. As is typical of stars with giant planets, it has a high metallicity, with an iron abundance 82% larger than the Sun's.

The secondary star, Epsilon Reticuli B, is known as a visual companion since 1930, and in 2006 was confirmed as a physical companion on the basis of its common proper motion. It was noted that its color indices are incompatible with a main sequence object, but are consistent with a white dwarf. This was confirmed in 2007 by spectroscopic observations, that showed the absorption spectrum typical of a hydrogen-rich white dwarf (spectral type DA). This star has a visual apparent magnitude of 12.5 and is located at a separation of 13 arcseconds, corresponding to a projected physical separation of 240 AU and an orbital period of more than 2,700 years.

From a measured effective temperature of 15,310 K, it has a cooling age (time spent as a white dwarf) of 200 million years, corresponding to a total age of 1.5 billion years. This age is inconsistent with the primary estimated age of 2.8 billion years, which suggests a smaller mass for the white dwarf or a larger mass for the primary.

Planetary system 
On December 11, 2000, a team of astronomers announced the discovery of a planet Epsilon Reticuli b. With a minimum mass of 1.17 that of Jupiter, the planet moves around Epsilon Reticuli with an average separation of 1.16 AU. The eccentricity of the planet is extremely low (at 0.06), and it completes an orbit every 418 days (or 1.13 years).

Stability analysis shows that the planet's Lagrangian points would be stable enough to host Earth-sized planets, though as yet no trojan planets have been detected in this system.

References

External links 
 

K-type subgiants
White dwarfs
Binary stars
Reticulum (constellation)
Reticuli, Epsilon
Durchmusterung objects
Gliese and GJ objects
027442
019921
1355
Planetary systems with one confirmed planet